SomTV is the fibre optic television offer in Andorra distributed by the sole operator, Andorra Telecom.

It offers free Spanish and French channels as well as the Movistar Plus+ package.

Andorra Telecom is also in charge of broadcasting digital terrestrial television throughout the country.

Channel list
In addition to the basic package (Mini), it is possible to subscribe to the Movistar+ packages:

Movistar+ Selección
Cine
Several sport packs (Futbol, MotoGP, Golf and Formula 1)
Single channels (Mezzo, Playboy TV)
Movistar+ Total Plus: all Movistar+ channels

Cinema

Series

Children

Documentary

Music

Hunting and fishing

Catalan

Spanish

French

International

Information

Sport

Adulte

Sport multicanaux

References

Communications in Andorra